Andrés Gómez and Javier Sánchez were the defending champions, but Sánchez did not compete this year. Gómez teamed up with Sergi Bruguera and lost in the semifinals to Boris Becker and Eric Jelen.

Horacio de la Peña and Diego Nargiso won the title by defeating Becker and Jelen 3–6, 7–6, 6–4 in the final.

Seeds
The first four seeds received a bye to the second round.

Draw

Finals

Top half

Bottom half

References

External links
 Official results archive (ATP)
 Official results archive (ITF)

1991 ATP Tour